Dale J. Van Harlingen (born July 22, 1950) is an American condensed matter physicist.

Education and career
Van Harlingen graduated from Ohio State University with a bachelor's degree in 1972, a master's degree in 1974 and a doctorate in 1977. As a postdoc he spent a year at the Cavendish Laboratory in Cambridge, England and three years with John Clarke at the University of California, Berkeley, where he did research on non-equilibrium superconductors and DC electronics with SQUIDs. Van Harlingen became in 1981 a professor at the University of Illinois at Urbana-Champaign (UIUC) and is now a professor of physics at the UIUC's Laboratory for Materials Research and the NSF Science and Technology Center for Superconductivity.

Van Harlingen does research "on the physics of superconductor materials and devices and on the application of microfabrication, cryogenic, and superconductor electronic techniques to problems of fundamental interest in condensed matter physics." He and his team created innovative scanning probe instruments, especially, the Scanning SQUID Microscope which does imaging of vortex configurations and dynamics in superconductor systems. After high-temperature superconductivity was discovered in 1986, Van Harlingen and his colleagues pioneered the phase-sensitive SQUID interferometry technique which enabled the verification of the exotic d-wave symmetry. In fundamental experiments, with David Wollman, Donald Ginsberg and Anthony Leggett, he determined the symmetry properties of the order parameter in high-temperature superconductors involving some copper oxides. The discovery of such symmetry properties caused a huge research effort to understand the exotic d-wave symmetry and its relation to the mechanisms of unconventional superconductors.

In 1998 he received, jointly with John R. Kirtley, Donald Ginsberg and Chang C. Tsuei, the Oliver E. Buckley Condensed Matter Prize for "using phase-sensitive experiments in the elucidation of the orbital symmetry of the pairing function in high-Tc superconductors." He was elected in 1995 a fellow of the American Physical Society, in 1999 a member of the American Academy of Arts and Sciences, and in 2003 a member of the National Academy of Sciences, He was awarded a Guggenheim Fellowship for the academic year 2001–2002.

Selected publications

References

External links
  
  (Quantum Science Summer School, Pennsylvania State University)
  (lecture by Dale J. Van Harlingen, September 9, 2008)
  (Saturday Physics for Everyone lecture)
 

1950 births
Living people
20th-century American physicists
21st-century American physicists
Condensed matter physicists
Ohio State University alumni
University of Illinois Urbana-Champaign faculty
Oliver E. Buckley Condensed Matter Prize winners
Fellows of the American Physical Society
Fellows of the American Academy of Arts and Sciences
Members of the United States National Academy of Sciences